EtonHouse International Education Group is headquartered in Singapore with 120 schools in over 12 countries. Together these schools provide education to over 12,000 children globally.

There are 9 IB schools in the EtonHouse family.

History
The first EtonHouse school was opened in Singapore in 1995 by Ng Gim Choo, who had been inspired by her observations as a parent of play-based preschools in London. Initially, the school had difficulty acquiring local staff due to a lack of educators with early-childhood education training and so brought in teachers from overseas. By 2010, the Group was earning  $40 million a year with 26 schools across Asia with an emphasis on expanding into China.

The group managed alongside its regular institutions three main operations: EtonHouse E-Bridge, which offered education at lower fees in return for government priority in opening. High demand for registration created long lines and a requirement for revision to enrollment procedures. In October 2014 EtonHouse announced plans to open its first high school in cooperation with The Singapore Chinese Highschool, to be located in Bukit Timah, to be ready in 2016. The group also announced a partnership with Hwa Chong International to open a bilingual preschool/primary school in the same city. Due to laws in Singapore, while the preschool will be open for enrollment to everyone, the primary school will be international only, with Singaporean children taken only in exceptional circumstances.

The Group also announced its investment of $110mil in a China campus project in Deyang of Sichuan, China in 2017. The new campus will have a capacity of 5000 students and includes 3 campuses - a standalone kindergarten, a primary and secondary school, a kindergarten and high school campus as well as a teacher training centre.

In September 2017, EtonHouse has expanded to the Middle East through a franchise agreement with MBA Fakhro Group, and opened Etonhouse Bahrain division, the first Etonhouse preschool in Bahrain, and in August 2020 announced plans to open Etonhouse kindergarten.

Etonhouse International Schools list

Bahrain 
 EtonHouse International Pre-School, Bahrain

Cambodia 
 EtonHouse International School, Phnom Penh

China 
 EtonHouse International Pre-School, Changshu
 EtonHouse International Pre-School, Chengdu
 EtonHouse International Pre-School, Chongqing
 EtonHouse International Pre-School, Chongzhou
 EtonHouse International School & Bilingual Pre-School, Dalian
 EtonHouse International Pre-School, Deqing
 EtonHouse International School & Pre-School, Dongguan
 EtonHouse International School (FEIS), Foshan
 EtonHouse International Pre-School, Harbin
 EtonHouse International Pre-School, Henan Luohe
 EtonHouse International Pre-School, Henan Xinxiang
 EtonHouse International Pre-School, Henan Zhengzhou
 EtonHouse International Pre-School, Jinan
 EtonHouse International Pre-School, Kunming
 EtonHouse International Pre-School, Mianyang
 EtonHouse International School & Pre-School, Nanjing
 EtonHouse International Pre-School, Shanghai
 EtonHouse International Pre-School, Shenzhen
 EtonHouse International School & Pre-School, Suzhou
 EtonHouse Pre-School Xiangcheng Weitang, Suzhou
 EtonHouse International Pre-School, Wenzhou
 EtonHouse International Pre-School, Xian
 EtonHouse International Pre-School, Xichang
 EtonHouse International Pre-School, Xuzhou
 EtonHouse International Pre-School, Zhuhai

Indonesia 
 EtonHouse International Pre-School, Jakarta
 EtonHouse International Pre-School, Surabaya

Japan 
 EtonHouse Karuizawa Learning Hub
EtonHouse International Pre-School, Tokyo

Kazakhstan 
 EtonHouse International School, Kazakhstan

Malaysia 
 EtonHouse Malaysia International School, Kuala Lumpur
 Etonhouse International Pre-School, Melaka

Myanmar 
 EtonHouse International Pre-School, Yangon

Singapore 
 EtonHouse International School, Broadrick
 EtonHouse International Pre-School, Claymore
 EtonHouse Pre-School, Islander
 EtonHouse International Pre-School, Mountbatten 718
 EtonHouse Pre-School, Mountbatten 717
 EtonHouse Mountbatten, 223 Pre-School
 EtonHouse Pre-School, Newton
 EtonHouse International School, Orchard
 EtonHouse Pre-School, Robertson Walk
 EtonHouse Sentosa International Pre-School & Primary Education, Sentosa
 EtonHouse International School, Thomson
 EtonHouse Pre-School, Upper Bukit Timah
 EtonHouse Pre-School, Vanda
 EtonHouse Zhong Hua Pre-School

Vietnam 
 EtonHouse Thao Dien, Ho Chi Minh City

References

International schools in Singapore
Educational institutions established in 1995
1995 establishments in Singapore